Route 1A is a  long provincial highway in central Prince Edward Island. The route is a spur route of the Route 1 which connects the Trans-Canada Highway near Borden-Carleton and the Confederation Bridge with the city of Summerside. Route 1A is unnamed except for the portion within Summerside city limits, where it is known as Read Drive.

Major intersections

References

001A
Prince Edward Island 001A
001A
Summerside, Prince Edward Island